Astafjorden is a fjord (more accurately, a strait) in Troms og Finnmark county, Norway. It flows through the municipalities of Salangen, Gratangen, Ibestad, and Tjeldsund. There are several small fjords that branch off this fjord including: Lavangen, Gratangen, Grovfjorden, and Salangen.

Name
The fjord (and the former municipality of Astafjord) were named after the old Ånstad farm (Old Norse: Arnastaðafjǫrðr).  The first element of the old name comes from the male name Arna or "Arne", the second element staða means "home" or "farm", and the last element fjǫrðr is identical with the word for "fjord".  Thus, the fjord by Arne's farm.

Another possible explanation for the origin of the name of the Astafjord in Troms might be that it was named after Queen Asta, mother of King "Hellige" Olav in the 11th century who allegedly brought Christianity to Norway.

See also
 List of Norwegian fjords

References

Fjords of Troms og Finnmark
Tjeldsund
Ibestad
Gratangen
Salangen